The Roman Catholic Diocese of San José del Guaviare is a diocese located in the city of San José del Guaviare in the Ecclesiastical province of Villavicencio in Colombia.

History
19 January 1989: Established as Apostolic Vicariate of San José del Guaviare from the  Apostolic Prefecture of Mitú
29 October 1999: Promoted as Diocese of San José del Guaviare

Ordinaries
Vicars Apostolic of San José del Guaviare
 Belarmino Correa Yepes, M.X.Y. (1989.01.19 – 1999.10.29); see below
Bishops of San José del Guaviare
 Belarmino Correa Yepes, M.X.Y. (1999.10.29 – 2006.01.17); see above
 Guillermo Orozco Montoya (2006.01.17 – 2011.02.02) Appointed, Bishop of Girardota
 Francisco Antonio Nieto Sua (2 February 2011 – 26 June 2015) Appointed, Bishop of Engativá
 Nelson Jair Cardona Ramírez (7 May 2016 – present)

See also
Roman Catholicism in Colombia

Sources

External links
 GCatholic.org

Roman Catholic dioceses in Colombia
Roman Catholic Ecclesiastical Province of Villavicencio
Christian organizations established in 1989
Roman Catholic dioceses and prelatures established in the 20th century